Giacinto Allegrini (born 4 September 1989) is an Italian footballer who plays as a centre back for  club Audace Cerignola.

Career
He played the 2009–2010 season for Lega Pro Seconda Divisione team Gubbio on loan from Bari.
In July 2016, he joined Andria on a free transfer. But on 6 December 2017, he terminates his contract with the club to join Audace Cerignola until the end of the season.

He won the promotion to Serie C with Audace Cerignola in 2021-22 season.

Notes

External links

1989 births
Living people
Footballers from Bari
Italian footballers
Association football defenders
Serie B players
Serie C players
Lega Pro Seconda Divisione players
Serie D players
S.S.C. Bari players
A.S. Noicattaro Calcio players
A.S. Gubbio 1910 players
Valenzana Mado players
S.S. Monopoli 1966 players
A.S. Bisceglie Calcio 1913 players
S.S. Fidelis Andria 1928 players
S.S.D. Audace Cerignola players
Taranto F.C. 1927 players